Air Ghana is a cargo airline of Ghana with its head office at Ghana Airport Cargo Center (GACC) in Accra, Ghana, and its main hub at Kotoka International Airport in Accra.

History 

Air Ghana was founded in 1993 as an air logistics company. It grew to provide ground handling, cargo handling, GSSA and aviation support services over the next two decades.

In 2014, Air Ghana received its Air Operator Certificate from Ghana Civil Aviation Authority and commenced operations with a Boeing 737-400 freighter on behalf of DHL.

In 2016, Air Ghana opened the Ghana Airport Cargo Center, a 10,000 sq.m dedicated cargo warehouse facility supplemented by 9,000 sq.m of office space, in partnership with Ghana Airports Company Limited and Swissport.

Fleet 

The Air Ghana fleet consists of the following aircraft (as of March 2021):

 1 Boeing 737-400F (operated for DHL Aviation); registration 9G-AGL.

Destinations
Air Ghana operates the following services as of March 2021.

 Abidjan – Félix-Houphouët-Boigny International Airport
 Accra – Kotoka International Airport
 Lagos - Murtala Muhammed International Airport
 Lome Tokoin - Gnassimbé Eyadéma

References

External links
 Official website

Airlines of Ghana
Airlines established in 1993
Ghanaian companies established in 1993